Improta is an Italian surname. Notable people with the surname include:

 Ciro Improta (born 1991), Italian footballer
 Giancarlo Improta (born 1987), Italian footballer
 Riccardo Improta (born 1993), Italian footballer
 Umberto Improta (born 1984), Italian footballer

Italian-language surnames